Joseph Cephus Patton IV (January 5, 1972 – September 13, 2022) was an American football tackle in the National Football League for the Washington Redskins.  He played college football at Alabama A&M University and was drafted in the third round of the 1994 NFL Draft.

References 

1972 births
2022 deaths
20th-century African-American sportspeople
African-American players of American football
Players of American football from Birmingham, Alabama
American football offensive guards
Alabama A&M Bulldogs football players
Washington Redskins players